This is a timeline documenting the events of heavy metal in the year 1989.

Newly formed bands

Abhorrence
Abruptum
Absu 
Alleycat Scratch
Anonymus 
Archgoat 
ASAP  
Baby Animals
Bad Acid Trip
Bal-Sagoth
Beherit
Benediction
Bonham
Brainstorm 
 Brujeria
 Bruce Dickinson's solo career starts (though he remains with Iron Maiden until 1993).
Cathedral
Cemetary 
Ceremonial Oath 
Clawfinger 
Conception
 Consolation
Count Raven
Cry of Love
Cyclone Temple
Damaged
Damn Yankees
Dark Tranquillity (as Septic Broiler)
Dead Head
Def Con Dos
Demoncy
Desultory
Detritus 
diSEMBOWELMENT
Dissection
Doro (begins solo career)
Downset.
Dungeon
Earth 
Earth Crisis 
Edge of Sanity
Electric Angels
Enchant 
Eucharist 
Exit-13
Falkenbach
Fear Factory
FireHouse
The Four Horsemen
Galactic Cowboys
 Gamma Ray
The Gathering
General Surgery 
Golem  
Gore Beyond Necropsy
 Gorefest
 Gorguts
Gruntruck
Haggard 
Helmet 
Hum  
Human Remains  
Incantation
Infectious Grooves
 Iniquity
 Isengard
JBO
Killing Addiction
Konkhra
Kreyson
Last Days of Humanity
Life of Agony
 Living Sacrifice
Lynch Mob
 Marilyn Manson
Mindrot
Misanthrope 
Monster Magnet
Moonblood
Morgana Lefay
 Mortician
Motorpsycho
My Sister's Machine
 Necromantia
 Necrophobic
Nightstalker
Novembers Doom
Obscenity 
Obtained Enslavement
Only Living Witness
Oomph!
Opeth
Ophthalamia
Pitch Shifter
Platero y Tú
Red Harvest 
Reverend
Ringworm
Riverdogs
Rorschach
Royal Hunt
Sacrament 
Saviour Machine
Scatterbrain 
The Scream
Seigmen
Sentenced
Sex Machineguns
Sigh
The 69 Eyes
Slaughter
Sonic Violence
Spread Eagle
Starkweather
Steelheart
Stone Temple Pilots
Stuck Mojo
Talisman
Tang Dynasty 
Therapy?
Thorns
Thought Industry
Thunder 
Tourniquet 
Turbonegro
Type O Negative
Unleashed
Varga 
Vomitory
While Heaven Wept
The Wildhearts
Wizard
Wuthering Heights

Albums

 24-7 Spyz - Harder Than You
 Acid Reign - The Fear
 Accept - Eat the Heat
 Addictive - Pity of Man
 Aerosmith - Pump
 Agony Column – God, Guns and Guts
 Alias (US) – Metal to Infinity
 Alice Cooper - Prince of Darkness (comp)
 Alice Cooper - Trash
 Amulance – Feel the Pain
 Angelica – Angelica
 The Angels, aka Angel City - Beyond Salvation
 Angkor Wat  – When Obscenity Becomes the Norm...Awake!
 Annihilator - Alice in Hell
 Anthem - Hunting Time
 Apollo Ra – Ra Pariah 
 Atheist - Piece of Time
 Autopsy - Severed Survival
 The Awful Truth – The Awful Truth
 Babylon A.D. - Babylon A.D.
 Bad Brains - Quickness
 Badlands - Badlands
 Bang Tango – Live Injection
 Bang Tango - Psycho Café
 Barren Cross – State of Control
 Beau Nasty – Dirty But Well Dressed
 Believer - Extraction from Mortality
 Black Sabbath - Headless Cross
 Blacksmith – Fire from Within 
 Blind Guardian - Follow the Blind
 Bloodgood - Out of the Darkness
 Blue Murder - Blue Murder
 Bonfire - Point Blank
 Bonham – The Disregard of Timekeeping
 Bolt Thrower - Realm of Chaos: Slaves to Darkness
 Candlemass - Tales of Creation
 Cannibal Corpse - Cannibal Corpse (demo)
 Carcass - Symphonies of Sickness
 Cats In Boots - Kicked and Klawed
 China - Sign in the Sky
 Cloven Hoof – A Sultan's Ransom 
 Coroner - No More Color
 Coven - Death Walks Behind You
 Cro-Mags - Best Wishes
 Cruella – Vengeance Is Mine
 Cry Wolf - Cry Wolf
 The Cult - Sonic Temple
 Cynic - Reflections of a Dying World (demo)
 D.A.D – No Fuel Left For The Pilgrims
 Damien - Stop This War
 Danger Danger - Danger Danger
 Dangerous Toys - Dangerous Toys
 Dark Angel - Leave Scars
 D.D.T. - Victims
 Dead Horse – Horsecore: An Unrelated Story That's Time Consuming
Dead Brain Cells - Universe
 Deliverance - Deliverance
 Destruction - Live Without Sense (live) 
 Devastation – Signs of Life
 Doro - Force Majeure
 Dream Theater - When Dream and Day Unite
 D.R.I. - Thrash Zone
 Dirty Blonde – Passion
 Dirty Looks – Turn of the Screw
 Dyoxen - First Among Equals
 Earthshaker - Treachery
 Electric Boys - Funk-O-Metal Carpet Ride
 Entombed - But Life Goes On (demo)
 Enuff Z'Nuff - Enuff Z'Nuff
 Equinox - Auf Wiedersehen
 Evildead - Annihilation of Civilization
 Excel - The Joke's on You
 Exodus - Fabulous Disaster
 Extreme - Extreme
 EZO - Fire Fire
 Faith No More - The Real Thing
 Faster Pussycat – Wake Me When Its Over
 Fates Warning - Perfect Symmetry
 Fifth Angel – Time Will Tell
 Forbidden - Raw Evil: Live at the Dynamo (EP)
 Forced Entry – Uncertain Future 
 The Four Horsemen – The Four Horsemen (EP)
 The Front - The Front
 Gammacide – Victims of Science
 Glory – Danger In this Game
 Grave - Anatomia Corporis Humani (demo)
 Great White - ...Twice Shy
 Grinder - Dead End
 Godflesh - Streetcleaner
 Gorky Park - Gorky Park
 Guardian - First Watch
 Gun – Taking On the World
 Heavy Pettin' – Big Bang
 Heavens Gate – In Control
 Heir Apparent - One Small Voice
 Helix - Over 60 minutes with...
Helloween - Live in the U.K. (live) 
 Helstar - Nosferatu
 Hermética - Hermética
 Holy Moses - The New Machine of Lichtenstein
 Howe II – High Gear
 Icon - Right Between the Eyes
 Intruder - "A Higher Form of Killing"
 Jailhouse - Alive In A Mad World (EP)
 Jersey Dogs – Don't Worry, Get Angry! (EP)
 Junkyard – Junkyard
 Keel - Larger Than Live
 King Diamond - Conspiracy
 Kingdom Come - In Your Face
 King's X - Gretchen Goes to Nebraska
 KISS - Hot in the Shade
 Kreator - Extreme Aggression
 Korzus - Pay For Your Lies (EP)
 Richie Kotzen – Richie Kotzen
 L.A. Guns - Cocked & Loaded
 Lȧȧz Rockit - Annihilation Principle
 Lȧȧz Rockit - Holiday In Cambodia (EP)
 Last Crack - Sinister Funkhouse #17
 Leatherwolf - Street Ready
 Lillian Axe – Love + War
 Little Caesar – Name Your Poison (EP)
 Living Death - Worlds Neuroses
 Lizzy Borden - Master of Disguise
 Lobotomia - Nada É Como Parece
 Loudness - Soldier of Fortune
 Macabre - Gloom
 Yngwie Malmsteen - Trial by Fire: Live in Leningrad 
 Marchello – Destiny
 Marshall Law – Marshall Law
 Alex Masi – Attack of the Neon Shark 
 Massacra - Nearer from Death (demo)
 Masters of Reality – Masters of Reality
 McAuley Schenker Group - Save Yourself
 Mekong Delta - The Principle of Doubt
 Mercy – King Doom
 Meshuggah – Meshuggah, aka Psykisk Testbild (EP)
 Metal Massacre - Metal Massacre X (Compilation, various artists)
 Metal Church - Blessing in Disguise
 Michael Monroe – Not Fakin It 
 Midas Touch – Presage to Disaster
 Mindless (Sinner) - Missin' Pieces
 Ministry - The Mind Is a Terrible Thing to Taste
 Morbid Angel - Altars of Madness
 Mordred – Fools Game
 Morgoth - Resurrection Absurd (EP)
 Mortal Sin - Face of Despair
 Mortem - Slow Death
 Mr. Big - Mr. Big
 Mötley Crüe - Dr. Feelgood
 Mystic-Force – Take Command (EP)
 Napalm - Cruel Tranquility
 Nasty Savage – Penetration Point 
 Nine Inch Nails - Pretty Hate Machine
 Nirvana (band) - Bleach
 Nitro - O.F.R.
 Nuclear Assault - Handle with Care
 Obituary - Slowly We Rot
 The Obsessed – The Obsessed
 Oliver Magnum – Oliver Magnum
 Onslaught - In Search of Sanity
 Overkill - The Years of Decay
 Paradox – Heresy
 Pariah – Blaze of Obscurity
 Pestilence - Consuming Impulse
 Phantom Blue - Phantom Blue
 Poltergeist – Depression
 Pretty Boy Floyd - Leather Boyz With Electric Toyz
 Primus - Suck on This (live)
 Princess Pang - Self Titled album
 Rage - Secrets in a Weird World
 Repulsion - Horrified 
 Reverend - Reverend (EP)
 Rotting Christ - The Other Side of Life (split EP with Sound Pollution)
 Rigor Mortis - Freaks (EP)
 Riot – Riot Live
 Rollins Band - Hard Volume
 Running Wild - Death or Glory
 Rush - A Show of Hands (live)
 Rush - Presto
 Sabbat - Dreamweaver (Reflections of Our Yesterdays)
 Sacred Reich - Alive at the Dynamo (EP)
 Sacred Warrior – Master's Command
 Sacrilege - Turn Back Trilobite
 Saint Vitus - V
 Saraya - Saraya
 Sarcófago - Rotting (EP)
 Joe Satriani - Flying in a Blue Dream
 Savatage - Gutter Ballet
 Scanner - terminal Earth
 Scorpions – Best of Rockers and Ballads
 Sea Hags – Sea Hags
 Sepultura - Beneath the Remains
 Shakin' Street – Live and Raw!
 Shark Island – Law of the Order 
 Shotgun Messiah – Shotgun Messiah
 Shout – In Your Face
 Signal - Loud & Clear
 Silent Rage - Don't Touch Me There
 Skid Row - Skid Row
 Sodom - Agent Orange
 Soundgarden - Louder Than Love
 Jack Starr's Burning Starr – Jack Starr's Burning Starr
 Steve Stevens – Atomic Playboys
 Stone - No Anaesthesia!
 Stratovarius - Fright Night
 Suicidal Tendencies - Controlled by Hatred/Feel Like Shit...Déjà Vu
 Sweaty Nipples – Straight Outta Portland
 Tankard - Hair of the Dog (comp)
 Terrorizer - World Downfall
 Tesla - The Great Radio Controversy
 Testament - Practice What You Preach
 Thanatos - Omnicoitor (demo)
 Titan Force  – Titan Force
 TNT – Intuition
 Tora Tora – Surprise Attack
 Toxik - Think This
 Trance – Back in Trance
 T.T. Quick – Sloppy Seconds
 Tyrranicide - God Save the Scene
 Unseen Terror - The Peel Sessions 
 Vader - Necrolust (demo)
 Vain – No Respect
 Venom - Prime Evil
 Victory – Culture Killed the Native
 Viking - Man of Straw
 Viper - Theatre of Fate
 Voivod - Nothingface
 W.A.S.P. - The Headless Children 
 Warrant - Dirty Rotten Filthy Stinking Rich
 Watchtower - Control and Resistance
 Wehrmacht - Biermacht
 Whiplash – Insult to Injury
 White Lion - Big Game
 Whitesnake - Slip of the Tongue
 White Zombie - Make Them Die Slowly
 Winter - Hour of Doom (demo)
 Wrathchild America - Climbin' the Walls
 Xentrix - Shattered Existence
 X Japan - Blue Blood
 XYZ - XYZ
 Zed Yago – Pilgrimage
 Zion - Thunder From the Mountain

Disbandments
 Cacophony
 Destruction (Schmier leaves the band)
 Dokken (reformed in 1993)
 Lion

Events
 Primus records their live album Suck on This at Berkeley Square in Berkeley, California on February 25 and March 5.
 Mötley Crüe's album Dr. Feelgood reaches number one on the Billboard Top 100.
 Bon Jovi, Cinderella, Ozzy Osbourne, Scorpions, Mötley Crüe, and Skid Row take part in the Moscow Music Peace Festival on August 12 & August 13, 1989.
 For the first time in its history, a Grammy is given for Best Hard Rock/Metal Performance. The award is given to Jethro Tull for Crest of a Knave.
 Jason Becker is diagnosed with ALS.
 Faith No More, Soundgarden and Voivod embark on a U.S. tour together.
 Future Metallica bassist Robert Trujillo joins Suicidal Tendencies (and remains with them until their split in 1995). Following his participation, the band would abandon their hardcore punk style and become more of a thrash metal/funk metal band.
 Steve Vai leaves David Lee Roth's solo band and joins Whitesnake.
 Rick Rozz leaves Death and is replaced by then-future Obituary and Testament guitarist James Murphy. The new Death line-up (Chuck Schuldiner/James Murphy/Terry Butler/Bill Andrews) eventually records a new album that would be released next year.
 Jethro Tull is awarded "Best Hard Rock/Metal Performance Vocal or Instrumental" to boos from the audience at the 31st Grammy Awards.

1980s in heavy metal music
Metal